Cosdon Hill, also called Cosdon Beacon, or Cawsand Beacon, is one of the highest hills on Dartmoor, in Devon, England.
It has numerous traces of prehistoric occupation.

Description
The first written record of the hill is to the Hoga de Cossdonne in 1240. The name Cossdonne seems to mean "Cost(a)'s hill", where "Cost" or "Costa" is the name of a person.

The shape of the hill gives a false impression of size, and for many years Cosdon was thought to be the highest on Dartmoor.
The surveyors of the Principal Triangulation of Great Britain took bearings that resulted in the first Ordnance Survey map of Dartmoor in 1809, which showed that Yes Tor was higher.
However, in 1830 Samuel Rowe still wrote that Cawson or Cosdon hill was the highest in Dartmoor.
An 1894 guide for cyclists going from Exeter to Launceston said, "So vast is the bulk of Cosdon that, were is not for the cloud mists that so often drift round his brow, one would hardly at first sight credit his height of 1799 feet."

From the summit of Cosdon it is often possible to see the English Channel from Teignmouth to Start Point, and on a clear day the Bristol Channel may be visible. 
The hill provides an excellent view over Dartmoor.
As  Thomas Clifton Paris wrote in 1865, "Far and wide stretch its desolate hills, the ancient haunt of wolves and wild deer, and barbarians as untamed ; a solitary wondrous region, everywhere darkened by morasses, but piled with fantastic rocks and glowing with innumerable tints."

History

A Neolithic flint axe has been found at the western foot of the hill.
There were nine Bronze Age settlements around the western edge of the hill and two associated reaves, or stone walls, that may have marked the boundaries between territories.
There are also many stone cairns, kistvaens, stone rows and what may be a stone circle.
Some of these have been badly damaged by stones being removed later for other uses.
There is a very large cairn on the summit, which may well have been the site of a beacon.

An 1896 report described three parallel lines of stones, starting from a cairn surrounded by a circle, on the North Tawton Common on the east side of Cosdon.
The report noted that a wall was being built around a large slice of the common, and masons had been working for several years breaking up and removing stones for the wall.
There were signs that an inner circle was buried in the cairn.
Two kistvaens were found within the cairn.
One was intact but the coverer and two side stones had been taken from the other.

Dartmoor was called a forest in 1238.
It was granted by Henry III of England to his brother, Richard, Earl of Cornwall and Poictou, in 1248.
The extent of the Forest of Dartmoor was verified by the solemn oath of twelve Perambulators.
The commissioners began their perambulation at Cosdon Hill in the north quarter of Dartmoor, then followed a circuit of the moor, returning to the starting point at Cosdon.
Samuel Rowe (1793–1853), Vicar of Crediton, noted in 1848 that they started at a point near the foot of the hill called Hoga de Cosdowne, and said this must have been near the banks of the Taw close to Sticklepath.
Arthur B. Prowse wrote in 1892 that the starting point must have simply been the summit of the hill.

In the 1840s an adit was driven into the hill, and lodes of mispickel and copper ore were found.
The shaft of the Ivy Tor Copper mine was sunk in 1851, and the mine continued to be worked for several years.
By 1867 Ivy Tor had been united with Copper Hill to form Belstone Consoles, on the river Tavy.
The mispickel at Ivy Tor contained bismuth.
Actinolite and feldspar were also found at Ivy Tor.
For some time the hill was a shooting moor for grouse and occasional deer.
Some granite shooting butts can still be seen on the north and east of the hill.
There is a trig point, Flush Bracket Number S5362, on the summit of the hill, from which a wide area of country can be viewed.

On Cawsand Beacon

Elias Tozer (1825–73) wrote,

Notes

Sources

External links

Dartmoor
Hills of Devon